Alessandro Ciranni (born 28 June 1996) is a Belgian professional footballer who plays as a full back for Zulte Waregem.

Club career
Ciranni was born in Genk. After spending half a season on loan at Dutch Eerste Divisie side MVV from his parent club Genk, he signed a two-year contract with the South Limburgers in summer 2016.

A free-kick specialist possessing a Belgian, Dutch and Italian passport, Ciranni then joined newly-promoted Fortuna Sittard from their provincial rivals in summer 2018.

He joined Belgian side, Royal Excel Mouscron in July 2019.

In June 2021, he signed a three-year contract with Zulte Waregem.

Personal life
Born in Belgium, Ciranni is of Italian descent.

References

External links
 
 Voetbal International profile 
 

1996 births
Living people
Belgian footballers
Belgium youth international footballers
Belgian people of Italian descent
Association football fullbacks
K.R.C. Genk players
MVV Maastricht players
Fortuna Sittard players
Royal Excel Mouscron players
S.V. Zulte Waregem players
Eredivisie players
Eerste Divisie players
Belgian Pro League players
Belgian expatriate footballers
Expatriate footballers in the Netherlands
Belgian expatriate sportspeople in the Netherlands
Sportspeople from Genk
Footballers from Limburg (Belgium)